Bolivosteus chacomensis is a rhenanid placoderm from the Eifelian of Bolivia, and is the only placoderm known from the “Malvinokaffric” invertebrate faunas.  The Malvinokaffric faunas represent a series of cold-water ecosystems near or at the South Pole during the Middle Devonian, and apparently lacked the presence of ammonoids, bryozoa, or colonial corals.   B. chacomensis is known from skull fragments and scales.

References 

Rhenanida
Placoderm genera
Placoderms of South America
Devonian Bolivia
Fossils of Bolivia
Fossil taxa described in 1986